Medeon is a municipal unit in Aetolia-Acarnania, Greece.

Medeon may also refer to:
Medeon (Acarnania), a town of ancient Acarnania
Medeon (Boeotia), a town of ancient Boeoetia
Medeon (Phocis), a town of ancient Phocis
Medun, a city of ancient Illyria